Acrocercops chrysoplitis is a moth of the family Gracillariidae, known from Uttarakhand, India. It was described by Edward Meyrick in 1937. The hostplant for the species is Shorea robusta.

References

chrysoplitis
Moths of Asia
Moths described in 1937